Quest Broadcasting Inc. is a Philippine radio network. Its corporate office is located at Unit 907, 9th floor, Paragon Plaza, EDSA cor. Reliance St., Mandaluyong. Quest operates a number of stations across the country under the Magic Nationwide network.

History
The company was established in 1986 as the SBS Radio Network Inc. (Sarao Broadcasting Systems), co-owned by the Sarao family (owner of Las Piñas-based Sarao Motors) and the Vera family (original owners of FBS Radio Network). In 1992, Luis and Leonida Vera's eldest son, Atty. Jose Luis Vera, took full control of the company and renamed it as Quest Broadcasting Inc.

Radio stations

Magic Nationwide stations

Affiliate/Other stations

Former stations

Notes

References

Quest Broadcasting
Mass media companies established in 1986
Philippine radio networks
1986 establishments in the Philippines
Companies based in Mandaluyong
Tiger 22 Media Corporation